Woman in Car is a 2021 Canadian psychological thriller film, written, produced, and directed by Vanya Rose. The film stars Hélène Joy as Anne, a former archer who has happily settled into life as the trophy wife of a wealthy businessman, but who feels threatened and lapses into obsession when her stepson David (Anthony Lemke) brings home his new girlfriend Safiye (Liane Balaban) for the first time.

The film entered production in 2019.

The film premiered in March 2021 at the Cinequest Film & Creativity Festival, and had its Canadian premiere as part of the 2021 Canadian Film Festival.

Awards
Simon and Erika Angell of the indie pop band Thus Owls received a Canadian Screen Award nomination for Best Original Song at the 10th Canadian Screen Awards in 2022, for their song "Lovers Are Falling".

References

External links

2021 films
2021 thriller films
Canadian psychological thriller films
English-language Canadian films
2020s English-language films
2020s Canadian films